Köse Mihal (Turkish for "Michael the Beardless"; 13th century –  1340) accompanied Osman I in his ascent to power as a bey and founder of the Ottoman Empire. He is considered to be the first significant Byzantine renegade and convert to Islam to enter Ottoman service. (see Nöker)

He was also known as Gazi Mihal  and Abdullah Mihal Gazi. He ruled over Harmankaya Kalesi.

Life 
Köse Mihal was the Byzantine governor of Chirmenkia (Harmankaya, today Harmanköy) and was ethnically Greek. According to one theory, the origin of Köse Mikhail . It is based on the Cuman-Kipchaks that John III Doukas Vatatzes  placed as a border force.    His original name was "Michael Kosses". The castle of Harmankaya was in the foothills of the Uludağ Mountains in Bilecik, Turkey.  Mihal also eventually gained control of Lefke, Mekece and Akhisar.

Even before his conversion to Islam, Mihal had an amicable relationship with the Ottoman leader 
, Osman Ghazi. He was an ally of Osman and his people in war, and also acted as a leader of the local Greek population. Additionally, he acted as a consultant and diplomatic agent for Osman I. The sources describing the reason behind Mihal's change of faith vary. One tradition emphasises the influence exerted by his friendship with Osman Ghazi, whilst another describes him having experienced a significant dream which convinced him to become a Muslim. His conversion is thought to have occurred between 1304 and 1313. As a Muslim, he was known as Köse Mihal 'Abd Allah (Abdullah), Abdullah being a name commonly adopted by converts.

Up to the conquest of Bursa in 1326, Köse Mihal played an important role as a diplomatic advisor and envoy of Orhan I, the son and successor of Osman Ghazi. Köse Mihal was the first important Christian renegade to become an Ottoman subject, and he played a significant role in the creation of the Ottoman state. Köse Mihal's descendants, known as the Mihaloğlu, were famous, particularly in the 15th and 16th centuries. They were a politically and militarily successful family of Ottoman dignitaries in Rumelia. However, they did not reach the very highest public offices.

After the taking of Bursa, Köse Mihal is no longer mentioned in the sources. Kreutel notes that Köse Mihal died around 1340. According to some historians, Köse Mihal was buried at Türbe, Edirne (Adrianople), in a mosque he himself built, in this tradition Köse Mihal was believed to have lived until after the Ottoman capture of Adrianople by Murad I in the year 1361. He would therefore have lived to a very advanced age indeed. However, Franz Babinger appears to have made a mistake. He confused Köse Mihal with Ghazi Mihal Bey, a grandson of Köse Mihal. Ghazi Mihal Bey built a now ruined Mosque complex, with an Imaret and Hamam, in Edirne, which was completed in 1422. The cemetery adjoining the complex holds the tomb of Ghazi Mihal Bey.

Legacy
Mihal's descendants (the Mikhaloglu/Mikhaloglou; Greek: Μιχαλόγλου) held prominent positions through centuries of Ottoman history.

Previously the oldest surviving Ottoman artifact was Orhan's helmet. But on 5 December 2020, the Ministry of National Defense of Turkey announced that Mihal's sword was recorded as the oldest surviving Ottoman artifact, and was taken to Istanbul Military Museum.

In popular culture
In the Turkish television series  (1988), Köse Mihal was portrayed by Turkish actor Ahmet Mekin.

In the Turkish movie Killing the Shadows, Köse Mihal is portrayed by Serdar Gökhan. 

In the Turkish series Kuruluş: Osman, Köse Mihal is portrayed by Serhat Kılıç.

See also
 Renegade thesis
 Turgut Alp
 Konur Alp

Further reading 

 Dervish Ahmet-i 'Aşıki (called' Aşık Paşa, son): tevarihMenakıb u-i 'Al-i' Osman(Memories and times of the House of Osman). In Kreutel Richard Franz (Hrsg. / Editor):From Shepherd's Tent to Sublime Porte. Ottoman historian Vol 3, Graz 1959
 Joseph Hammer Purgstall:History of the Ottoman Empire. Bd.1, Pest 1827
 Nicolae Jorga:The history of the Ottoman Empire,according to sources presented verbatim reissue, Primus Verlag Darmstadt 1997
 John Leunclavius:Annales Svltanorvm Othmanidarvm, A Tvrcis Sva Lingva Scripti Frankfurt a. M. 1588/1596, German:Neu Chronica Türckischer nation of self-described Türcke ... Frankfurt a. M. 1590
 Majoros Ferenc u. Bernd Rill:The Ottoman Empire 1300–1922, Wiesbaden 2004
 Mihaloğlu Mehmet Paşa Nüzhet: " Ahval-i Gazi Mihal ". 1897 (Ottoman)
 Mehmet Neşrî:Kitab-i Cihan-Nümâ. Partially edited and translated in Journal of the German Oriental Society. 13. Volume 1859
 MİHALOĞULLARI published in the 30th volume of TDV Encyclopedia of Islam, pp. 24–25 in Istanbul (2005)

References and notes

External links 
 The Akinci family Mihaloğlu

13th-century births
14th-century Byzantine people
14th-century people from the Ottoman Empire
14th-century Ottoman military personnel
1340s deaths
Byzantine Anatolians
Greek Muslims
Greek former Christians
Former Greek Orthodox Christians
Converts to Islam from Eastern Orthodoxy
Byzantine defectors
Mihaloğulları